Ilaprazole (trade name Noltec) is a proton pump inhibitor (PPI) used in the treatment of dyspepsia, peptic ulcer disease (PUD), gastroesophageal reflux disease (GORD/GERD)  and duodenal ulcer.

It is available in strengths of 5, 10, and 20 mg.

Clinical studies show that ilaprazole is at least as potent a PPI as omeprazole when taken in equivalent doses. Studies also showed that ilaprazole significantly prevented the development of reflux oesophagitis.

Ilaprazole is developed by Il-Yang Pharmaceutical (Korea), and is still under clinical trials with US FDA. It has launched in Korea and China for the treatment of gastric ulcer, duodenal ulcer, gastroesophageal reflux disease and erosive esophagitis.

Ilaprazole is sold in Mexico by Chinoin Pharmaceuticals under the brand name Norutec.

References

Benzimidazoles
Proton-pump inhibitors
Pyridines
Pyrroles
Sulfoxides
Aromatic ethers